Holmi or Holmoi was a town of ancient Phrygia. It is mention by Strabo as lying on the main road from Carura to Lycaonia near that road's entry into the mountainous region.

Its site is unlocated.

References

Populated places in Phrygia
Former populated places in Turkey
Lost ancient cities and towns